The 2013 Deadly Awards were hosted by Luke Carroll and Karla Grant at the Sydney Opera House on 10 September 2013. The Awards program was broadcast nationally on SBS One on 14 September 2013. The awards event was an annual celebration of Australian Aboriginal and Torres Strait Islander achievement in music, sport, entertainment and community.

Lifetime achievement
Ella Award for Lifetime Achievement in Aboriginal and Torres Strait Islander Sport: Adam Goodes (AFL)
Jimmy Little Award for Lifetime Achievement in Music and the Performing Arts: Steve Mullawalla Dodd
The Marcia Langton Award For Lifetime Achievement In Leadership: Pat O'Shane
The Lifetime Contribution Award For Healing The Stolen Generations: Archie Roach

Music
Single Release of the Year: "Something's Got a Hold on Me" – Jessica Mauboy
Album Release of the Year: Archie Roach – Into the Bloodstream
Male Artist of the Year: Troy Cassar-Daley
Female Artist of the Year: Jessica Mauboy
Band of the Year: Street Warriors
Most Promising New Talent in Music: Stik n Move
Hip Hop Artist of the Year: Yung Warriors

Sport
Sportsman of the Year: Daniel Geale (boxing)
Female Sportsperson of the Year: Ashleigh Barty (tennis)
AFL Player of the Year: Adam Goodes
NRL Player of the Year: Johnathan Thurston
Most Promising New Talent in Sport: Mariah Williams (field hockey)

The arts
Film of the Year: The Sapphires
TV Show of the Year: Redfern Now
Male Actor of the Year: Luke Carroll (Redfern Now)
Female Actor of the Year: Deborah Mailman
Published Book of the Year: NPY Women's Council Aboriginal Corporation for Traditional Healers of Central Australia: Ngangkari
Dancer of the Year: Ella Havelka
Visual Artist of the Year: Brenda Croft

Community
Outstanding Achievement in Aboriginal and Torres Strait Islander Health: Professor Pat Dudgeon
Aboriginal and Torres Strait Islander Health Worker of the Year: Leonie Morcome (Biripi Aboriginal Medical Service)
Excellence in Health through the Promotion of Healthy and Smoke Free Lifestyles: Rewrite Your Story Campaign, developed by Puiyurti (Don't Smoke) Tackling Tobacco Program
Outstanding Achievement in Aboriginal and Torres Strait Islander Employment: Gavin Lester – Koori Job Ready
Community Broadcaster of the Year: John Harding (3CR Melbourne)
Outstanding Achievement in Aboriginal and Torres Strait Islander Education: Deadly Sista Girlz and the David Wirrpanda Foundation
Journalism Story of the Year: NITV News – Shayden and Junaid Thorne in Saudi Arabia
Outstanding Achievement In Cultural Advancement: Shellie Morris
Scientist or Science Project of the Year: Gerry Turpin

References

External links
The 2013 Deadlys

2013 in Australian music
The Deadly Awards
Indigenous Australia-related lists